Russian roulette is a potentially lethal game of chance in which a player places a single round in a revolver, spins the cylinder, places the muzzle against the head or body (of the opponent or themselves), and pulls the trigger. If the loaded chamber aligns with the barrel, the weapon will fire, killing or severely injuring the player.

Russian refers to the supposed country of origin, and roulette to the element of risk-taking and the spinning of the revolver's cylinder, which is evocative of a roulette wheel.

Origin
According to Andrew Clarke, the first trace of Russian roulette can be found in the short story "The Fatalist", which was written in 1840 and was part of the collection A Hero of Our Time by Mikhail Lermontov, a Russian poet and writer. In the story, which is set in a Cossack village, the protagonist, Grigory Alexandrovich Pechorin, claims that there is no predestination and proposes a bet in order to prove it, laying about twenty gold pieces onto a table. A lieutenant of the dragoons of the Tsar, Vulič, a man of Serbian origins with a passion for gambling, accepts the challenge and randomly takes one of a number of pistols of various calibres from its nail, cocks it and pours gunpowder onto the pan. Nobody knows if the pistol is loaded or not. "Gentlemen! Who will pay 20 gold pieces for me?", Vulič asks, putting the muzzle of the pistol to his forehead. He then asks Grigory to throw a playing card in the air, and when the card lands, he pulls the trigger. The weapon fails to fire, but when Vulič cocks the pistol again and aims it at a service cap hanging over the window, a shot rings out and smoke fills the room.

Etymology
The term Russian roulette was possibly first used in a 1937 short story of the same name by Georges Surdez, published in the January 30, 1937, edition of Collier's magazine:

References to the term in the context of the Collier's story appeared in some newspapers during 1937. The first independent appearances of the term in newspapers began in 1938 with the reports of young men being killed while playing it. The earliest instance appears to have been the death of a 21-year-old former journalism student in Austin, Texas, appearing in The Austin Statesman and some other Texas newspapers on January 8, 1938. At least four other deaths were attributed to Russian roulette during the year: a 34-year-old policeman in Peoria, Illinois, a 20-year-old in Houston, an 18-year-old in Saratoga Springs, New York, and a 16-year-old in Los Angeles.

Subsequently, the term became a metaphor for taking foolhardy risks and its usage steadily increased in reportage of diplomacy, politics, economics, medicine and sports.

Probability 

Math in this section is based on the use of a six-shot revolver with a single chamber loaded. Abnormal factors, such as the possibility of a dud round, are not included.

Variant: revolver re-spun after each trigger pull 
With this variant, turn order is essential, because the probability of losing decreases the later one's turn is.

Variant: revolver only spun once at the start 
With this variant, turn order has no effect on the all-game loss probability, which remains the same for all players, but influences the single-pull probability, which increases with each pull.

However, since, like in the re-spinning variant, all players only come into the game if and when each of the players before them has caught an empty chamber, the all-game loss probability for player  is

Notable incidents
 An American Institute of Physics profile of William Shockley, co-inventor of the transistor and winner of the Nobel Prize for Physics, claims that he attempted suicide by playing a solo game of Russian roulette.
 In a 1946 U.S. legal case, Commonwealth v. Malone, 47 A.2d 445 (1946), a Pennsylvania teenager's conviction for murder in the second degree as a result of shooting a friend was upheld by the Pennsylvania Supreme Court. In this case, the teenagers involved played a modified version of Russian roulette, called Russian poker, in which they took turns aiming and pulling the trigger of the revolver at each other, rather than at their own heads. The court ruled that "When an individual commits an act of gross recklessness without regard to the probability that death to another is likely to result, that individual exhibits the state of mind required to uphold a conviction of manslaughter even if the individual did not intend for death to ensue."
 On 25 December 1954, American blues musician Johnny Ace killed himself in Texas, after a gun he pointed at his own head discharged. A report in The Washington Post attributed this to Russian roulette, but this was disputed by two witnesses.
 Graham Greene related in his first autobiography, A Sort of Life (1971), that he played Russian roulette, alone, a few times as a teenager.
 Malcolm X, in his 1965 autobiography, recalls an incident during his burglary career when he once played Russian roulette, pulling the trigger three times in a row to convince his partners in crime that he was not afraid to die. In the epilogue to the book, Alex Haley states that Malcolm X revealed to him that he palmed the round. The incident is portrayed in the 1992 film adaptation of the autobiography.
 In 1972, under the influence of alcohol and cocaine, the French singer and actor Johnny Hallyday played multiple games of Russian roulette with his mistress, the American singer and actress Nanette Workman. Laeticia Smet, his last wife, revealed in 2018 that he "has done this several times. But that was a long time ago ... At the time, he was playing with his destiny".
On 24 July 1973, Dallas Police Officer Darrell L. Cain murdered Santos Rodriguez, a 12-year-old Mexican-American child, while interrogating him and his brother about a burglary. Cain shot Rodriguez after spinning the cylinder of his revolver, Russian roulette-style, in an effort to force a confession.
 On 10 September 1976, Finnish magician  killed himself in front of a crowd while performing his Russian roulette act in Hartola. He had been performing the act for about a year, selecting six bullets from a box of assorted live and dummy ammunition.
The 1978 film The Deer Hunter depicts captured South Vietnamese and American soldiers being forced to play Russian roulette as their Viet Cong captors bet on who will survive. Several teen deaths following the movie's release caused both police and the media to accuse the film of inspiring the youths.
 John Hinckley Jr., who attempted to assassinate President Ronald Reagan in 1981, was known to have played Russian roulette, alone, on two occasions. Hinckley also took a picture of himself in 1980 in which he pointed a gun at his head.
 On 12 October 1984, while waiting for filming to resume on Cover Up (1985), actor Jon-Erik Hexum played Russian roulette with a .44 Magnum revolver loaded with a blank. The blast fractured his skull and caused massive cerebral hemorrhaging when bone fragments were forced through his brain. He was rushed to Beverly Hills Medical Center, where he was pronounced brain-dead.
 On 5 October 2003, psychological illusionist Derren Brown appeared to take part in a game of Russian roulette live on UK television. Two days later, a statement by the police said they had been informed of the arrangements in advance, and were satisfied that "There was no live ammunition involved and at no time was anyone at risk."
 The BBC program Who Do You Think You Are?, on 13 September 2010, featured the actor Alan Cumming investigating his grandfather Tommy Darling, who he discovered had died playing Russian roulette while serving as a police officer in British Malaya. The family had previously believed he had died accidentally while cleaning his gun.
 On 11 June 2016, MMA fighter Ivan "JP" Cole apparently killed himself by playing Russian roulette.

Drinking games 
There is a drinking game based on Russian roulette. The game involves six shot glasses filled by a non-player: five are filled with water, but the sixth with vodka. Among some groups, low quality vodka is preferred, as it makes the glass representing the filled chamber less desirable. The glasses are arranged in a circle, and players take turns choosing a glass to take a shot from at random.

There is also a game called "Beer Hunter" (titled after the Russian roulette scenes in the film The Deer Hunter). In this game, six cans of beer are placed between the participants: one can is vigorously shaken, and the cans are scrambled. The participants take turns opening the cans of beer right under their noses; the person who opens the shaken can (and thus sprays beer up their nose) is deemed the loser.

See also

 Counterphobic attitude
 Forced suicide
 Quantum suicide

References

Roulette and wheel games
Russian games
Revolvers
Suicide methods
Torture